The Women's Nations Cup (formerly known as the Air Canada Cup, the MLP Nations Cup and the Meco Cup) is an annual women's ice hockey tournament, held in Germany, Austria and Switzerland. Six nations are participating, five countries with their national team and Canada who are playing with their national under-22 team.

Results

Overall medal count

References

External links
 MLP Nations Cup 2010
 MLP Nations Cup 2011

 
Ice hockey tournaments in Europe
Women's ice hockey tournaments
International ice hockey competitions hosted by Germany
International ice hockey competitions hosted by Switzerland
International ice hockey competitions hosted by Austria